Bacchisa dioica is a species of beetle in the family Cerambycidae. It was described by Léon Fairmaire in 1878. It is known from China.

References

D
Beetles described in 1878